The 2002 Vuelta a Asturias was the 46th edition of the Vuelta a Asturias road cycling stage race, which was held from 15 May to 19 May 2002. The race started and finished in Oviedo. The race was won by Leonardo Piepoli of the  team.

General classification

References

Vuelta Asturias
2002 in road cycling
2002 in Spanish sport